Clostridioides mangenotii is a bacterium from the family Peptostreptococcaceae.

References

Bacteria described in 1947
Peptostreptococcaceae